This is a list of high schools in the state of Oklahoma, USA.

Adair County

Cave Springs High School, Bunch
Stilwell High School, Stilwell
Watts High School, Watts
Westville High School, Westville

Alfalfa County

Aline-Cleo High School, Aline
Burlington High School, Burlington
Cherokee High School, Cherokee
Timberlake High School, Helena

Atoka County

Atoka High School, Atoka
Caney High School, Caney
Stringtown High School, Striptown 
Tushka High School, Atoka

Beaver County

Balko School, Balko
Beaver High School, Beaver
Forgan High School, Forgan
Turpin High School, Turpin

Beckham County

Erick High School, Erick
Sayre High School, Sayre

Elk City

 Elk City High School
 Merritt High School

Blaine County

Canton High School, Canton
Geary High School, Geary
Okeene Junior-Senior High School, Okeene
Watonga High School, Watonga

Bryan County

Achille High School, Achille
Bennington High School, Bennington
Caddo High School, Caddo
Calera High School, Calera
Colbert High School, Colbert
Rock Creek High School, Bokchito

Durant

Durant High School
Silo High School

Caddo County

Anadarko High School, Anadarko
Apache High School, Apache
Binger-Oney High School, Binger
Carnegie High School, Carnegie
Cement High School, Cement
Cyril High School, Cyril
Fort Cobb-Broxton High School, Fort Cobb
Gracemont High School, Gracemont
Hinton High School, Hinton
Hydro-Eakly High School, Hydro
Lookeba-Sickles High School, Lookeba

Canadian County

Banner School, El Reno
Calumet High School, Calumet
El Reno High School, El Reno
Mustang High School, Mustang
Piedmont High School, Piedmont
Union City High School, Union City

Yukon

Southwest Covenant School
Yukon High School

Carter County

Fox Junior-Senior High School, Fox
Healdton High School, Healdton
Lone Grove High School, Lone Grove
Springer High School, Springer
Wilson High School, Wilson

Ardmore

Ardmore High School
Dickson High School
Plainview High School

Cherokee County

Hulbert Junior-Senior High Schoo, Hulbert
Keys High School, Park Hill

Tahlequah

Sequoyah High School
Tahlequah High School

Choctaw County

Boswell High School, Boswell
Fort Towson High School, Fort Towson
Hugo High School, Hugo
Soper High School, Soper

Cimarron County

Boise City High School, Boise City
Felt High School, Felt

Cleveland County

Lexington High School, Lexington
Noble High School, Noble

Norman

Little Axe High School
Norman High School
Norman North High School

Oklahoma City

Moore High School
Westmoore High School
Southmoore High School

Coal County

Coalgate High School, Coalgate
Tupelo High School, Tupelo

Comanche County

Cache High School, Cache
Chattanooga High School, Chattanooga
Elgin High School, Elgin
Fletcher High School, Fletcher
Geronimo High School, Geronimo
Indiahoma High School, Indiahoma
Sterling High School, Sterling

Lawton

Eisenhower High School
Lawton High School
MacArthur High School

Cotton County

Big Pasture High School, Randlett
Temple High School, Temple
Walters High School, Walters

Craig County

Bluejacket High School, Bluejacket
Ketchum High School, Ketchum
Welch Junior-Senior High School, Welch

Vinita

Vinita High School
White Oak High School

Creek County

Bristow High School, Bristow
Depew High School, Depew
Drumright High School, Drumright
Kellyville High School, Kellyville
Kiefer High School, Kiefer
Mannford High School, Mannford
Mounds High School, Mounds
Oilton High School, Oilton
Olive High School, Drumright
Sapulpa High School, Sapulpa

Custer County

Arapaho High School, Arapaho
Butler High School, Butler
Clinton High School, Clinton
Thomas-Fay-Custer Unified High School, Thomas
Weatherford High School, Weatherford

Delaware County

Colcord High School, Colcord
Grove High School, Grove
Jay High School, Jay
Kansas High School, Kansas
Oaks-Mission High School, Oaks

Dewey County

Seiling Junior-Senior High School, Seiling
Taloga High School, Taloga
Vici High School, Vici
Leedey High School, Leedey

Ellis County

Arnett High School, Arnett
Fargo-Gage High School, Fargo
Shattuck Senior High School, Shattuck

Garfield County

Cimarron High School, Lahoma
Covington-Douglas High School, Covington
Drummond High School, Drummond
Garber High School, Garber
Kremlin-Hillsdale High School, Kremlin

Enid

Chisholm High School
Enid High School
Oklahoma Bible Academy

Waukomis

Pioneer-Pleasant Vale High School, Waukomis
Waukomis High School, Waukomis

Garvin County

Elmore City-Pernell High School, Elmore City
Lindsay High School, Lindsay
Maysville High School, Maysville
Paoli High School, Paoli
Pauls Valley High School, Pauls Valley
Stratford Junior-Senior High School, Stratford
Wynnewood High School, Wynnewood

Grady County

Alex Junior-Senior High School, Alex
Amber-Pocasset High School, Amber
Bridge Creek High School, Blanchard
Chickasha High School, Chickasha
Minco High School, Minco
Ninnekah Senior High School, Ninnekah
Rush Springs High School, Rush Springs
Tuttle High School, Tuttle
Verden High School, Verden

Grant County

Deer Creek-Lamont High School, Lamont
Medford High School, Medford
Pond Creek-Hunter Junior-Senior High School, Pond Creek

Greer County

Granite High School, Granite
Magnum High School, Magnum

Harmon County
Hollis High School, Hollis

Harper County

Buffalo High School, Buffalo
Laverne High School, Laverne

Haskell County

Keota High School, Keota
Kinta High School, Kinta
McCurtain High School, McCurtain
Stigler High School, Stigler

Hughes County

Calvin High School, Calvin
Dustin High School, Dustin
Stuart High School, Stuart
Wetumka High School, Wetumka

Holdenville

Holdenville High School
Moss High School

Jackson County

Blair High School, Blair
Duke High School, Duke
Eldorado High School, Eldorado
Olustee High School, Olustee

Altus

Altus High School, Altus
Navajo High School, Altus

Jefferson County

Ringling High School, Ringling
Ryan High School, Ryan
Waurika High School, Waurika

Johnston County

Coleman High School, Coleman
Milburn High School, Milburn
Mill Creek High School, Mill Creek
Tishomingo High School, Tishomingo
Wapanucka High School, Wapanucka

Kay County

Blackwell High School, Blackwell
Newkirk High School, Newkirk
Ponca City High School, Ponca City
Tonkawa High School, Tonkawa

Kingfisher County

Cashion High School, Cashion
Dover High School, Dover
Hennessey High School, Hennessey
Kingfisher High School, Kingfisher
Lomega High School, Omega
Okarche High School, Okarche

Kiowa County

Hobart High School, Hobart
Lone Wolf Junior-Senior High School, Lone Wolf
Mountain View-Gotebo High School, Mountain View
Snyder High School, Snyder

Latimer County

Panola High School, Panola
Red Oak High School, Red Oak
Wilburton High School, Wilburton

Le Flore County

Arkoma High School, Arkoma
Bokoshe High School, Bokoshe
Buffalo Valley High School, Talihina
Cameron High School, Cameron
Heavener High School, Heavener
Howe High School, Howe
Le Flore High School, Le Flore
Panama High School, Panama
Pocola High School, Pocola
Poteau High School, Poteau
Spiro High School, Spiro
Talihina High School, Talihina
Whitesboro High School, Whitesboro
Wister High School, Wister

Lincoln County

Agra High School, Agra
Carney High School, Carney
Chandler High School, Chandler
Davenport High School, Davenport
Meeker High School, Meeker
Prague High School, Prague
Stroud High School, Stroud
Wellston High School, Wellston

Logan County

Coyle High School, Coyle
Crescent High School, Crescent
Guthrie High School, Guthrie
Mulhall-Orlando High School, Orlando

Love County

Marietta High School, Marietta
Thackerville High School, Thackerville
Turner High School, Burneyville

Major County

Fairview High School, Fairview
Ringwood High School, Ringwood

Marshall County

Kingston High School, Kingston
Madill High School, Madill

Mayes County

Adair High School, Adair
Chouteau-Mazie High School, Chouteau
Locust Grove High School, Locust Grove
Pryor High School, Pryor
Salina High School, Salina

McClain County

Blanchard High School, Blanchard
Dibble High School, Dibble
Newcastle High School, Newcastle
Purcell High School, Purcell
Washington High School, Washington
Wayne High School, Wayne

McCurtain County

Battiest High School, Battiest
Broken Bow High School, Broken Bow
Eagletown High School, Eagletown
Haworth High School, Haworth
Idabel High School, Idabel
Smithville High School, Smithville
Valliant High School, Valliant
Wright City High School, Wright City

McIntosh County

Checotah High School, Checotah
Eufaula High School, Eufaula
Hanna High School, Hanna
Midway High School, Council Hill

Murray County
Davis High School, Davis

Sulpher

Oklahoma School for the Deaf
Sulphur High School

Muskogee County

Braggs High School, Braggs
Fort Gibson High School, Fort Gibson
Haskell High School, Haskell
Oktaha High School, Oktaha
Porum High School, Porum
Warner High School, Warner
Webbers Falls High School, Webbers Falls

Muskogee

Hilldale High School
Muskogee High School
Oklahoma School for the Blind

Noble County

Billings High School, Billings
Frontier High School, Red Rock
Morrison High School, Morrison
Perry High School, Perry

Nowata County

Nowata High School, Nowata
Oklahoma Union High School, South Coffeyville
South Coffeyville High School, South Coffeyville

Okfuskee County

Boley High School, Boley
Mason High School, Mason
Okemah High School, Okemah
Paden High School, Paden

Weleetka

Graham High School
Weleetka High School

Oklahoma County

Bethany High School, Bethany
Choctaw High School, Choctaw
Deer Creek High School, Edmond
Jones High School, Jones
Luther High School, Luther
Star Spencer High School, Spencer

Del City

Christian Heritage Academy
Del City High School
Destiny Christian School

Edmond

Edmond Memorial High School
Edmond North High School
Edmond Santa Fe High School
Oklahoma Christian School
Providence Hall Classical Christian School

Harrah

Harrah High School
Oklahoma Academy

Midway City
Carl Albert High School
Midwest City High School

Oklahoma City

Public

Capitol Hill High School
Classen School of Advanced Studies
Crooked Oak High School
Douglass High School
 Dove Science Academy
Emerson North Alternative High School
Emerson South Mid-High School
Grant High School
Harding Charter Preparatory High School
Harding Fine Arts Academy
John Marshall High School
Millwood High School
Northeast Academy
Northwest Classen High School
Oklahoma Centennial High School
Putnam City High School
Putnam City North High School
Putnam City West High School
Western Heights High School
Southeast High School

Private

Bishop McGuinness High School
Casady School
Crossings Christian School
Heritage Hall School
Mount Saint Mary High School
Oklahoma School of Science and Mathematics

Okmulgee County

Beggs High School, Beggs
Dewar High School, Dewar
Morris High School, Morris
Okmulgee High School, Okmulgee
Preston High School, Preston
Schulter High School, Schulter

Henryetta

Henryetta High School
Wilson High School

Osage County

Barnsdall High School, Barnsdall
Hominy High School, Hominy
Pawhuska High School, Pawhuska
Prue High School, Prue
Shidler High School, Shidler
Skiatook High School, Skiatook
Woodland High School, Fairfax
Wynona High School, Wynona

Ottawa County

Afton High School, Afton
Commerce High School, Commerce
Fairland High School, Fairland
Miami High School, Miami
Quapaw High School, Quapaw
Wyandotte High School, Wyandotte

Pawnee County

Cleveland High School, Cleveland
Pawnee High School, Pawnee

Payne County

Cushing High School, Cushing
Glencoe High School, Glencoe
Perkins-Tryon High School, Perkins
Ripley High School, Ripley
Stillwater High School, Stillwater
Yale High School, Yale

Pittsburg County

Canadian High School, Canadian
Crowder High School, Crowder
Haileyville High School, Haileyville
Indianola High School, Indianola
Kiowa High School, Kiowa
Pittsburg Public School, Pittsburg
Quinton High School, Quinton
Savanna High School, Savanna

Hartshorne

Hartshorne High School
Jones Academy

McAlester

Lakewood Christian High School
McAlester Christian Academy
McAlester High School

Pontotoc County

Allen High School, Allen
McLish High School, Fittstown
Roff High School, Roff
Stonewall High School, Stonewall

Ada

Ada Senior High School
Byng High School
Latta High School
Vanoss High School

Pottawatomie County

Asher High School, Asher
Dale High School, Dale
Earlsboro High School, Earlsboro
Macomb High School, Macomb
Maud High School, Maud
McLoud High School, McLoud
Tecumseh High School, Tecumseh
Wanette High School, Wanette

Shawnee

Bethel High School
Liberty Academy
North Rock Creek High School
Shawnee High School

Pushmataha County

Antlers High School, Antlers
Clayton High School, Clayton
Moyers High School, Moyers
Rattan High School, Rattan

Roger Mills County

Cheyenne High School, Cheyenne
Hammon High School, Hammon
Leedey High School, Leedey
Reydon High School, Reydon
Sweetwater High School, Sweetwater

Rogers County

Catoosa High School, Catoosa
Chelsea High School, Chelsea
Foyil High School, Foyil
Inola High School, Inola
Oologah-Talala High School, Oologah

Claremore

Claremore High School
Sequoyah High School
Verdigris High School

Seminole County

Bowlegs High School, Bowlegs
Butner High School, Cromwell
Konawa High School, Konawa
New Lima High School, Lima
Sasakwa High School, Sasakwa
Wewoka High School, Wewoka

Seminole

Seminole High School, Seminole
Strother High School, Seminole
Varnum High School, Seminole

Sequoyah County

Central High School, Sallisaw
Gans High School, Gans
Gore High School, Gore
Muldrow High School, Muldrow
Roland High School, Roland
Sallisaw High School, Sallisaw
Vian High School, Vian

Stephens County

Comanche High School, Comanche
Velma-Alma High School, Velma

Duncan

Duncan High School
Empire High School

Marlow

Bray-Doyle High School
Central High High School
Marlow High School

Texas County

Guymon High School, Guymon
Hardesty High School, Hardesty
Hooker High School, Hooker
Texhoma High School, Texhoma
Tyrone High School, Tyrone

Goodwell

Goodwell High School
Yarbrough High School

Tillman County

Davidson High School, Davidson
Frederick High School, Frederick
Grandfield High School, Grandfield
Tipton High School, Tipton

Tulsa County

Bixby High School, Bixby
Broken Arrow Senior High/Freshman Academy, Broken Arrow
Charles Page High School, Sand Springs
Collinsville High School, Collinsville
Glenpool High School, Glenpool
Jenks High School, Jenks
Liberty High School, Mounds
Sperry High School, Sperry

Owasso

Owasso High School
Owasso Ram Academy

Tulsa

Public

Berryhill High School
Booker T. Washington High School
Central High School
Dove Science Academy
East Central High School
Edison Preparatory School
McLain High School
Memorial High School
Nathan Hale High School
Will Rogers High School
Daniel Webster High School
Union High School

Private

Bishop Kelley High School
Cascia Hall Preparatory School
Holland Hall
Metro Christian Academy
Mingo Valley Christian School
Saint Augustine Academy
Tulsa School of Arts and Sciences
Wright Christian Academy

Wagoner County

Coweta High School, Coweta
Okay High School, Okay
Porter Consolidated High School, Porter

Wagoner

Wagoner Christian School
Wagoner High School

Washington County

Caney Valley High School, Ramona
Copan High School, Copan
Dewey High School, Dewey

Bartlesville

Bartlesville High School
Wesleyan Christian High School

Washita County

Burns Flat-Dill City High School, Burns Flat
Canute High School, Canute
Cordell High School, Cordell
Corn Bible Academy, Corn
Blanche Thomas High School, Sentinel

Woods County

Alva High School, Alva
Freedom High School, Freedom
Waynoka High School, Waynoka

Woodward County

Fort Supply High School, Fort Supply
Mooreland High School, Mooreland
Sharon-Mutual High School, Mutual
Woodward High School, Woodward

See also 
List of Oklahoma school districts by county

External links 
List of high schools in Oklahoma from SchoolTree.org

References

Oklahoma
High